Mahanubhavaru (meaning: VIPs) is a 2017 Kannada-language romantic film directed by Sandeep Nagalikar Sindhanur. The film starred Balachander, Gokul Raj, Anusha Rai, and Priyanka in lead roles. The music has been composed by Satish Mourya & Re-recording by Arjun Janya.Yogaraj Bhat has penned one song for the movie.  Puneeth Rajkumar and Sri Murali has also sung one song.

Plot 
The story revolves around two differently-minded friends named Ajay and Sanjay. They each have different plans, goals and their own views of ethics. Ajay wants to plan his life and go along with it, while Sanjay is an easy-going person who enjoys his life the way it ends up being. Both meet with their love in their journey. The movie concludes with the one on the right path.

Cast
 Balachander
 Gokul Raj
 Anusha Rai
 Priyanka
 Sadhu Kokila

Soundtrack
The music is scored by Satish Mourya. The soundtrack was released on 8 November 2017, and featured 7 tracks. The lyrics were written by Yogaraj Bhat, Sandeep Nagalikar, Satish Mourya, Magadi Lokesh and Srinivas.

References

External links
 
 

2017 films
2010s Kannada-language films
2017 masala films